Sid Collins (born Sidney Cahn Jr.) (July 17, 1922 – May 2, 1977) was an American broadcaster best known as the radio voice of the Indianapolis 500-Mile Race on the Indianapolis Motor Speedway Radio Network from 1952–1976. Collins coined the phrase describing the annual May motorsports event as "the greatest spectacle in racing."

Background
Born into a Jewish family that owned a neighborhood store in Indianapolis, Indiana, Cahn changed his professional name to Collins for fear of anti-semitism and discrimination in his chosen field of broadcasting.

Announcing
Collins worked for WIBC in Indianapolis. One year after he started at the 50,000-watt station, he became the Indianapolis Motor Speedway (IMS) track announcer for the south turn. He became a radio announcer for the track after Bill Slater became ill. He was named the chief announcer in 1952. That year he introduced his "full coverage concept", which replaced a five-minute rundown each hour. He sent letters to all of the radio stations on their network, but only 26 stations participated. The next year 110 stations participated and the number grew until it became 1,200 by 1980.

With live television coverage of the race prohibited until 1986, Collins' radio coverage drew a large audience every year, and his announcing as the "voice of the 500" became synonymous with the race itself. He told the world the deaths, accidents, incidents and crashes during the race. Collins received over 30,000 letters asking for a copy of the eulogy that he gave to Eddie Sachs after Sachs died in a crash on the second lap of the 1964 Indianapolis 500.

Collins also anchored TVS Television Network auto racing from Trenton, Milwaukee, Langhorne, Castle Rock, and Colorado for two years. He hosted national TV coverage of the Indianapolis 500 Festival Parade with Garry Moore, Steve Allen and Bob Barker for Hughes Sports Network. He was the subject of stories in Hot Rod magazine and The Saturday Evening Post.

Collins always signed off by quoting a serious thought or some poetry.

Death
In April 1977 Collins was diagnosed at the Mayo Clinic with amyotrophic lateral sclerosis (ALS) or Lou Gehrig's disease. After learning he had the incurable progressive paralyzing disease, Collins confided to friend and Indianapolis 500 anchor successor Paul Page that he was planning to take his own life. Collins committed suicide on May 2, 1977. He was 54.  Collins had been scheduled to announce his 30th Indianapolis 500 on May 29.

Awards
Collins received nine American Auto Racing Writers & Broadcasters Association awards as the best auto racing broadcaster in the nation. He was cited by the Indiana University radio/TV school as an outstanding graduate and was inducted into the Indiana Journalism Hall of Fame in 1979.
He was inducted into the Motorsports Hall of Fame of America in 2011.

References

American radio sports announcers
American television sports announcers
Indianapolis 500
Motorsport announcers
Suicides by hanging in Indiana
1922 births
1977 suicides
People with motor neuron disease
20th-century American Jews